Alberto Boniotti (born 23 March 1995) is an Italian football player who plays for FC Castiglione.

Club career
He made his Serie B debut for Brescia on 25 May 2014 in a game against Juve Stabia.

After training with FC Castiglione since November 2019, Boniotti officially signed with the club in January 2020.

References

External links
 

1995 births
Footballers from Brescia
Living people
Italian footballers
Brescia Calcio players
Pordenone Calcio players
Calcio Padova players
Cosenza Calcio players
Serie B players
Serie C players
Association football defenders